The House of Wołodkowicz (Valadkevičiai, Valadkovičiai, Volodkevičiai) is the name of a noble family originating from the Grand Duchy of Lithuania.

Origin 
The Wołodkowicz family is an ancient noble family originating from the Grand Duchy of Lithuania. Scholars argue whether the family name derives from Wolodko (born 1420), grandson of the Lithuanian Grand Duke Gediminas (1275-1341) or from his descendant Grand Duke Wolodko.

The Wołodkowicz family is known in the Minsk and Naugardukas Voivodeships as early as the 15th century. The wealthy family was part of the local clerical elite from at least from the late 16th century.

History

16th century 
Marcin Wołodkowicz (1510-1595), the son of Wolodko and his wife Racza, is the common ancestor of all members of the Wołodkowicz family. He was the ambassador of the Grand Duchy of Lithuania in Moscow from 1573 and the Governor of Minsk from 1588. He was married to Rajna princess Drucka-Horska. Marcin Wołodkowicz had eight children, most of which had high positions in the Grand Duchy of Lithuania.

17th century 
As a result, the family became far more numerous in the 17th century; its members mainly residing in the districts of Naugardukas and Minsk. During the 17th and 18th centuries members of the Wołodkowicz family played an important role in public life. Apart from political and governmental positions, members of the Wołodkowicz family held positions in the army and the Roman Catholic church. He was taken prisoner and sent into exile to Kazan in 1655.

18th and 19th centuries 
The founder of the French line of the Wołodkowicz family, Henry (1765-1825), partook in the Kościuszko Uprising in 1794 and after its failure, emigrated to France. He was Aide-de-camp of Napoleon, served as a general in the French army and from 1806 he was appointed commander of the Polish Legion of the Grande Armée. During the French invasion of Russia, he was exiled to Siberia and after having received amnesty, he moved to St. Petersburg where he died. He was awarded the Legion of Honour and his name 'Henry' is immortalized in the Arc de Triomphe in Paris.

Alexander Wołodkowicz (1806-1861) headed the rebels in the Vileika district during the November Uprising against the Russian Empire in 1830–1831. After the defeat, he emigrated to France. He was buried in Paris, but his heart was brought home and placed in the church of Radaškonys, the Wołodkowicz family's ancestral tomb.

Jakub Wołodkowicz was rector of the Jesuit College in Polotsk, Anna abbess of the Benedictine monastery in Minsk and Philip (1697-1778) Metropolitan of Kiev. Members of the Wołodkowicz family founded several monasteries and churches, such as a monastery and a seven domed church in Grozovo, a monastery in Navadvorcy, the Carmelite church in Minsk, the cathedral of Chelm, a church in Zary, a church in Radaškonys and a Russian Orthodox church in Čašnikai.

Branches 
There are several branches of the Wołodkowicz family:

"Gałąź Nowodworska" (Branch of Nowy Dwor)
"Gałąź Iwanska" (Branch of Iwansk)
"Gałąź Francuska" (French branch), After a failed third petition in 1903 to Nicholas II to regain lost lands in Belarus, Nicholas II confirmed the title of prince, with the exception that the prince's title may also be inherited through the female descendants, which resulted in the fusion of the names Pairier and Wolodkowicz to Pairier-Wolodkowicz. Furthermore, the French line also has the right to retain the title of Count granted to General Henri Wolodkowicz by Napoleon I.
"Gałąź Ukrainska" (Ukrainian branch)
"Gałąź Galucyska (Galician branch)

Many members of princely and other great aristocratic Lithuanian, Polish and Russian families have members of the Wołodkowicz family as one of their ancestors, such as Drucki-Horski, Drucki-Podbereski, Pac, Podhorski, Polubinski, Puzyna, Reytan, Radziwiłł, Sapieha and Tyszkiewicz.

In the 19th century, the branch of Iwansk became the most prominent of all branches of the Wołodkowicz family. Iwansk together with neighbouring villages was bought by Tadeusz Wołodkowicz in 1774. This was to become the main, though not the oldest, domain of this branch of the family. Owing to entrepreneurship and fortune the wealth of the Iwansk branch further increased during the next generations. Two years later Iwansk was inherited by his brother Wincenty (1761-1838) chamberlain of Frederick Augustus I of Saxony, who passed his properties to Emanuel Ignacy. Last owner of Iwansk was the son of Emanuel Ignacy, Wincenty Wołodkowicz (1846-1927). In 1917 his estates (Iwansk, Kopciowicze, Czaszniki, Solomerecze, Wojsznarowo, Podolanka, Stare Siolo, Krasne Siolo, Imszarki, Slobodka, Hatsyanava, Fedzki, Tovpentsy, Naviny, Vishanki, Pachaevici, Demidovichi, Prystoi, Medvedsk, Krasnitsa, Punki, Smolance and Deksniany) made about 100.000 hectares, including more than 20 towns and villages, as well as a paper mill ('Skinia'), mills, distillery plants, breweries, a brickyard and a glass factory. Iwansk had a famous stable of horses, which won prizes at races in Moscow and St. Petersburg. During the revolution of 1917, Wincenty Wołodkowicz escaped to Poland, where he died in Bydgoszcz in 1927.

Coat of arms
The Wołodkowicz family uses the Radwan coat of arms, with on top a dove holding a golden ring. The ensemble on a red banner that is on a coat of stoat surmounted by a closed crown. The ring in the beak of the dove represents the descendants from the Jagiellonian dynasty.

Notable members

 (fl. 1600-1670), wojewode of Nowogródek and Minsk and senator of the Lithuanian-Polish Commonwealth in the second half of the 17th century. Writer of historical books like 'The history of Inflant Wars', 'The life of prince Casimir' and 'On incorporation of the inflants by king Sigismund August'. Krzystof Wołodkowicz was very handsome and the Sultan of the Ottoman Empire commissioned Krzystof's portrait for his palace in Istanbul. Married to 1. Halszka princess Drucka-Sokolinska and 2. Izabela princess Massalska. 
Philip Wołodkowicz (1697-1778), bishop of Chelm, metropolitan of Kiev.
 (1735-1760), landowner, hooligan, notable for extraordinay physical force and courage. Fought bears with a wooden fork only. He is mentioned in Book VI "Pan Tadeusz" by Adam Mickiewicz as a man standing above the law. Sentenced to death for his improper behaviour.  
Jan Henryk Wołodkowicz (1765-1825), general in the French Army, aide de camp of Napoleon. Commander of the 2e Legion du Nord. Founder of the French branch. Married to 1. Anna Ferguson-Tepper, 2. Thérèse de Lasseray.
Wincenty Wołodkowicz (1761-1838), chamberlain of king Stanislaw August, marshall of the nobility of Borisov. Founder of the branch from Iwansk, Married to 1. Teresa Przezdziecka 2. countess Jadwiga Tyszkiewicz.
Emanuel Ignacy Wołodkowicz(1805-1852), landowner, entrepreneur. Married to 1. Victoria princess Drucka-Lubecka, 2. Alina princess Drucka-Lubecka.
Alexander Wołodkowicz (1806-1861), commander during the uprising Russia of 1830-1831, diplomat. Author of "Ni paix, ni sécurité pour l'Europe avec la Russie" (Paris 1855)
Wincenty Wołodkowicz (1846 1927), last owner of Iwansk, landowner, entrepreneur, State counsellor of the Russian Empire, honorary judge of the province of Lepel. Married to Sophia baroness Hartingh.

References

Sources

Wołodkowiczowie, studium genealogiczne, Ottawa 1978

Surnames
Polish noble families
Lithuanian noble families
Gediminids